Captain Emma Mutebi is a Ugandan airline pilot, who serves as a captain at Uganda Airlines, Uganda's national carrier airline, on the CRJ 900 aircraft, effective April 2019.

Career
Immediately prior to joining Uganda Airlines, Captain Mutebi was flying with Rwandair. He has also previously flown with Aircraft Leasing Services, based in Nairobi, Kenya. He also flew with Jet Link, also based in Nairobi and with DAS Air Cargo, based in Entebbe, Uganda.

Other considerations
In October 2019, Emma Mutebi was selected by Uganda Airlines, to be one of the four Ugandan pilots, who flew the third and fourth CRJ900s (5X–KDP and 5X–KNP), from Montreal, Canada on their delivery journey to Entebbe, Uganda, between 5 October 2019 and 7 October 2019.

See also
 Transport in Uganda
 Clive Okoth
 Cornwell Muleya
 Michael Etyang

References

External links
 Website of Revived Uganda Airlines

Living people
1970s births
Ugandan aviators
Commercial aviators
People from Central Region, Uganda